The following have served as presidents of the Royal Numismatic Society since its inception in 1836.

 1836–39 John Lee
 1839–41 Edward Hawkins
 1841–43 H. H. Wilson
 1843–45 Lord Albert Conyngham
 1845–47 H. H. Wilson
 1847–49 William Debonaire Haggard
 1849–51 Edward Hawkins
 1851–55 The Lord Londesborough  (Formerly Lord Albert Conyngham, President 1843–45)
 1855–74 W. S. W. Vaux
 1874–1908 Sir John Evans
 1908–14 Sir Henry Hoyle Howorth
 1914–19 Sir Arthur Evans
 1919–30 Sir Charles Oman
 1930–35 Percy H. Webb
 1935–36 Sir George MacDonald
 1936–37 Percy H. Webb
 1937–42 Edward A. Sydenham
 1942–48 Harold Mattingly
 1948–53 C. Humphrey V. Sutherland
 1953–56 Michael Grant
 1956–61 Christopher E. Blunt
 1961–66 Philip Grierson
 1966–70 Derek Allen
 1970–74 Colin M. Kraay
 1974–79 R. A. G. Carson
 1979–84 David Grenville Sellwood
 1984–89 John P. C. Kent
 1989–94 T. V. Buttrey
 1994–99 Michael Metcalf
 1999–2004 Harold B. Mattingly
 2005–2009 Joe Cribb
 2009–2013 Nicholas Mayhew
 2013–2018 Andrew Burnett
 2018–present Roger Bland

See also
List of presidents of the British Numismatic Society

References

Numismatic associations
Numismatics
Numismatists